Bizineh Rud District is in Khodabandeh County, Zanjan province, Iran. At the 2006 National Census, its population was 33,687 in 7,268 households. The following census in 2011 counted 33,917 people in 8,972 households. At the latest census in 2016, the district had 32,099 inhabitants in 9,390 households.

References 

Khodabandeh County

Districts of Zanjan Province

Populated places in Zanjan Province

Populated places in Khodabandeh County